Surakshit Samudaya is a Nepalese television magazine related to earthquake preparedness and disaster risk management. It is financially supported by the National Society For Earthquake Technology - Nepa and produced by All Three Media Ghar Pvt. Ltd. and broadcast on News24 TV every Saturday at 5:45 pm and repeated at midnight.

Production team
 Chief program producer : Sunil Koirala
 Visual editor : Sanam Shrestha
 Program producer : Shiva Shrestha
 Program co-ordinator : Ananda Poudel
 Presenter : Sabina Kiorala
 Reporter : Mimraj Pandeya
 Camera operator : Ratnamani Dahal
 Office assistant : Naresh Adhikari

References

Nepalese television series
2010s Nepalese television series